Martina Babáková (born 18 April 1983) is a Slovak former professional tennis player.

Biography
A right-handed player born in Žilina, Babáková was a top-50 junior who was most prominent on the professional tour as a doubles player.

Babáková won 18 ITF doubles titles and made her only WTA Tour main-draw appearance at the 2008 Budapest Grand Prix, with Anna Lapushchenkova in the doubles.

At the 2009 Summer Universiade in Belgrade, she partnered Katarína Kachlíková to win a women's doubles bronze medal for Slovakia. She also won a bronze medal for the team event.

ITF Circuit finals

Singles: 2 (0–2)

Doubles: 37 (18–19)

References

External links
 
 

1983 births
Living people
Slovak female tennis players
Sportspeople from Žilina
Universiade medalists in tennis
Universiade bronze medalists for Slovakia
Medalists at the 2009 Summer Universiade
21st-century Slovak women